Salzmannia is a genus of flowering plants belonging to the family Rubiaceae.

It is native to northern Venezuela and Brazil.

The genus name of Salzmannia is in honour of Philipp Salzmann (1781–1851), a German doctor, botanist and entomologist. 
It was first described and published in Prodr. Vol.4 on page 617 in 1830.

Known species
According to Kew:
Salzmannia arborea 
Salzmannia naiguatensis 
Salzmannia nitida 
Salzmannia plowmanii

References

Rubiaceae
Rubiaceae genera
Plants described in 1830
Flora of Venezuela
Flora of Brazil